The 1931 Memorial Cup final was the 13th junior ice hockey championship of the Canadian Amateur Hockey Association (CAHA). In 1931, the CAHA began selecting the final venue for the Allan Cup and the Memorial Cup championships a year in advance, instead of deciding only one month in advance.

The George Richardson Memorial Trophy champions Ottawa Primroses of the Ottawa City Junior Hockey League in Eastern Canada competed against the Abbott Cup champions Elmwood Millionaires of the Manitoba Junior Hockey League in Western Canada. In a best-of-three series, held at the Arena Gardens in Toronto, and the Ottawa Auditorium, Elmwood won their first Memorial Cup, defeating Ottawa 2 games to 1.

Scores
Game 1: Ottawa 2-0 Elmwood (in Toronto)
Game 2: Elmwood 2-1 Ottawa (in Toronto)
Game 3: Elmwood 3-0 Ottawa (in Ottawa)

Winning roster
George Brown, Archie Creighton, Spunk Duncanson, John Boyd Johnston, Kitson Massey, Bill MacKenzie, Gordie MacKenzie, Duke McDonald, Art Rice, Cliff Workman, Norm Yellowlees.  Coach: Jack Hughes

References

External links
 Memorial Cup
 Canadian Hockey League

1930–31 in Canadian ice hockey
Memorial Cup tournaments
Ice hockey competitions in Ottawa
Ice hockey competitions in Toronto
Memorial Cup
1930s in Toronto